A première, also spelled premiere, is the debut (first public presentation) of a play, film, dance, or musical composition.
A work will often have many premières: a world première (the first time it is shown anywhere in the world), its first presentation in each country, and an online première (the first time it is published on the Internet). 

When a work originates in a country that speaks a different language from that in which it is receiving its national or international première, it is possible to have two premières for the same work in the same country—for example, the play The Maids by the French dramatist Jean Genet received its British première (which also happened to be its world première) in 1952, in a production given in the French language. Four years later, it was staged again, this time in English, which was its English-language première in Britain.

History
Raymond F. Betts attributes the introduction of the film premiere to showman Sid Grauman, who founded Grauman's Chinese Theatre. The first ever Hollywood premiere was for the 1922 film Robin Hood, starring Douglas Fairbanks, in front of the Egyptian Theatre. By the late 1920s the red carpet had become synonymous with film premieres.

See also
Season premiere
Film festival
Film release
Television pilot

References

External links

Theatre
Film and video terminology
Television terminology
Music events
Beginnings